William James Peacock,  (born 14 December 1937) is an Australian molecular biologist who was Chief Scientist of Australia (2006–2008), President of the Australian Academy of Science (2002–2006) and Chief of CSIRO Plant Industry (1978–2003).

Peacock was born in Leura, New South Wales and educated at the University of Sydney, where he studied botany and zoology and gained a PhD in genetics. He followed this with post-doctoral positions in genetics at the University of Oregon in Eugene and molecular biology at Oak Ridge National Laboratory in Tennessee, before returning to Australia to work with the CSIRO.

Peacock is a Member of the Prime Minister's Science, Engineering and Innovation Council (PMSEIC) and the National Innovation Council and has served on the Australian Research Council (ARC) Grants Committee, the Australian Science, Technology and Engineering Council (ASTEC) and the Academy of Science's Committee on Recombinant DNA Molecules (ASCORD). In 2000, Dr Peacock was joint recipient of the inaugural Prime Minister's Prize for Science.

Peacock was appointed Chief Scientist of Australia on a part-time basis in March 2006, and his term concluded on 31 August 2008. Penny Sackett was appointed as his replacement, to take up the position on a full-time basis in November 2008.

Honours and awards
Peacock has had a distinguished career in science and has received many honours. He was awarded the Macfarlane Burnet Medal and Lecture in 1989 and made a Companion of the Order of Australia in 1994.

Peacock was elected a Fellow of the Royal Society of London in March 1982, a Fellow of the Australian Academy of Technological Sciences and Engineering and the Australian Institute of Agricultural Science, a Foreign Associate of the United States National Academy of Sciences, Foreign Fellow of the Indian National Science Academy, and a Foundation Member Academia Bibliotheca Alexandrinae.

References

External links
 The Chief Scientist
 Office of the Chief Scientist

1937 births
Living people
People from New South Wales
Fellows of the Royal Society
Companions of the Order of Australia
Fellows of the Australian Academy of Science
Chief Scientists of Australia
Fellows of the Australian Academy of Technological Sciences and Engineering
Foreign associates of the National Academy of Sciences
Foreign Fellows of the Indian National Science Academy
Farrer Medal recipients
Presidents of the Australian Academy of Science